Cryptocala is a genus of moths of the family Noctuidae.

Species
 Cryptocala acadiensis (Bethune, 1870)
 Cryptocala chardinyi (Boisduval, 1829)

References
Natural History Museum Lepidoptera genus database
Cryptocala at funet

Noctuinae